Jairus is a biblical name associated with the story of the Raising of Jairus' daughter.

People
Jairus Ang, the English name of Singaporean robbery victim Ang Jun Heng
Jairus Aquino (born 1999), Filipino actor
Jairus Birech (born 1992), Kenyan steeplechase runner
Jairus Byrd (born 1986), American football player
Jairus C. Fairchild (1801–1862), American politician and businessman
Jairus Lyles (born 1995), American basketball player
Jairus Edward Neal (1818–1882), American banker and politician
Jairus C. Sheldon (1827–1905), American politician from Illinois

Others
Peter Jairus Frigate, fictionalized version of the science fiction author Philip José Farmer in the Riverworld series
Papilio jairus, an alternate name for the Asian butterfly Taenaris urania

See also
 Jair (name)
 Yair (name)

Hebrew masculine given names